Prosphodrus is a genus of ground beetles in the family Carabidae. There are about five described species in Prosphodrus, found in New Zealand.

Species
These five species belong to the genus Prosphodrus:
 Prosphodrus mangamuka Larochelle & Larivière, 2021
 Prosphodrus occultus Britton, 1960
 Prosphodrus sirvidi Larochelle & Larivière, 2021
 Prosphodrus waimana Larochelle & Larivière, 2021
 Prosphodrus waltoni Britton, 1959

References

Platyninae